The Bombardier Incentro (sold as the ADtranz Incentro until 2001) is a model of tram manufactured initially by Adtranz and later by Bombardier Transportation. It is a five-section, low-floor articulated tram, built for bi-directional operation and capable of speeds up to 80 km/h. Incentro trams are used on the Nantes tramway and fifteen of the AT6/5 variants are used on the Nottingham Express Transit.

The Incentro was designed by Adtranz, which was acquired by Bombardier in 2001. Bombardier no longer promotes the model, favouring instead its own Flexity family, which includes similar models. The Incentro models had a strong influence on the development of the Flexity Berlin model presented during 2008. While Niigata Transys had licensed the design for the Japanese market, the drive shaft was changed in such a way that it is considered a separate model. The trams for the Fukui and Okayama tram systems, however, still look similar to the Incentro based on their headshape design.

Fleet details 

Incentro
Tram vehicles of France
Tram vehicles of the United Kingdom
Articulated passenger trains
Train-related introductions in 1999